Su Xun (22 May 1009 – 21 May 1066) was a Chinese essayist during the Song dynasty, best known for his essays. He is considered one of the Eight Masters of the Tang and Song, along with his sons Su Shi and Su Zhe.

A famous story (popularized by the 13th-century children's text Three Character Classic) relates how Su Xun (also known as Su Laoquan) did not begin to seriously study until he was 27, an age considered too old to start learning. Su Xun persevered and became a highly respected writer.
 

1009 births
1066 deaths
Chinese essayists
Su Shi